The 2012–13 Japan Figure Skating Championships took place on December 20–24, 2012 at the Makomanai Ice Arena in Sapporo. It was the 81st edition of the event. Medals were awarded in the disciplines of men's singles, ladies' singles and ice dancing. No pairs competition was held this year.

Results

Men

Ladies

Ice dancing

Japan Junior Figure Skating Championships
The 2012–13 Junior Championships took place on November 17–18, 2012 at the DyDo Drinco Ice Arena in Nishitōkyō, Tokyo.

Men

Ladies

Ice dancing

International team selections

World Championships
The Japanese team to the 2013 World Championships:

Four Continents Championships
The Japanese team to the 2013 Four Continents Championships:

World Junior Championships
The Japanese team to the 2013 World Junior Championships:

References

External links
 2012–13 Japan Figure Skating Championships
 Info at the JSF 
 

Japan Figure Skating Championships
Japan Championships
Figure Skating Championships